Kenneth Lee O'Neil Baugh,  (24 February 1941 – 1 September 2019) was a Jamaican politician and surgeon. A member of the Jamaica Labour Party, he served as Deputy Prime Minister, Minister of Foreign Affairs and Foreign Trade, and Minister of Health.

Early life
Kenneth Lee O'Neil Baugh was born on 24 February 1941 in Montego Bay, St. James, Jamaica. He attended Cornwall College and the University of the West Indies. Before entering politics, Baugh worked as a surgeon and Senior Medical Officer at the Cornwall Regional Hospital.

Career
Baugh served as general secretary and chairman of the Jamaica Labour Party. He represented Saint James North Western as a Member of Parliament from 1980 to 1987, then as a senator from 1989 to 1993. From 1997 till his retirement in 2016, Baugh was a Member of Parliament for West Central St. Catherine. Baugh also held various ministerial portfolios, including Minister of Health (1980–1989) and Minister of Foreign Affairs and Foreign Trade (2007–2011). In his first speech at the United Nations General Assembly (UNGA), Baugh "lustily condemned" how the European Union negotiated the Economic Partnership Agreements (EPA).

Later years and death
Baugh retired from politics in 2015 due to ill health. He had brain surgery later that year. Baugh died on 1 September 2019 from a long illness at the age of 78. A state funeral for Baugh was approved by the Cabinet of Jamaica on 9 September. The service was held at the University Chapel at The University of the West Indies in Mona, St. Andrews.

Recognition
In 2016, Baugh was awarded the Order of Jamaica for his political contributions to Jamaica. In October 2019, following Baugh's death, the Point Hill Medical Centre was renamed after him.

References

Foreign ministers of Jamaica
Ministers of Health of Jamaica
1941 births
2019 deaths
People from Montego Bay
Cornwall College, Jamaica alumni
Jamaica Labour Party politicians